Cassie Blakeway (born 18 April 1993) is an Australian rules footballer who played for the Geelong Football Club in the AFL Women's (AFLW).

AFLW career
Blakeway was recruited directly from Geelong's VFL Women's team prior to the club's inaugural season in the AFLW. Blakeway made her AFLW debut during the first round of the 2019 season, against Collingwood at GMHBA Stadium. In August 2020, Geelong delisted Blakeway.

Personal life
Blakeway was a junior Victorian softball representative, and studied a master's degree in teaching at Deakin University.

References

External links 

Geelong Football Club (AFLW) players
1993 births
Living people
Australian rules footballers from Victoria (Australia)
Sportswomen from Victoria (Australia)